The 2014 CAF Champions League (also known as the 2014 Orange CAF Champions League for sponsorship reasons) was the 50th edition of Africa's premier club football tournament organized by the Confederation of African Football (CAF), and the 18th edition under the current CAF Champions League format. The two-time defending champions Al-Ahly were eliminated in the second round by Al-Ahly Benghazi.

In the final, ES Sétif of Algeria defeated AS Vita Club of the Democratic Republic of the Congo on the away goals rule after drawing 3–3 on aggregate, to win their second title. They qualified for the 2014 FIFA Club World Cup, and earned the right to play in the 2015 CAF Super Cup.

Association team allocation
All 56 CAF member associations may enter the CAF Champions League, with the 12 highest ranked associations according to their CAF 5-Year Ranking eligible to enter two teams in the competition. The title holders could also enter if they had not already qualified for the CAF Champions League. As a result, theoretically a maximum of 69 teams could enter the tournament – although this level has never been reached.

For the 2014 CAF Champions League, the CAF used the 2008–2012 CAF 5-Year Ranking, which calculated points for each entrant association based on their clubs’ performance over those 5 years in the CAF Champions League and CAF Confederation Cup. The criteria for points were the following:

The points were multiplied by a coefficient according to the year as follows:
2012 – 5
2011 – 4
2010 – 3
2009 – 2
2008 – 1

Teams
The following teams entered the competition. Teams in bold received a bye to the first round. The other teams entered the preliminary round.

Associations are shown according to their 2008–2012 CAF 5-Year Ranking – those with a ranking score have their rank and score indicated.

Notes

The following associations did not enter a team:

 Benin
 Cape Verde
 Central African Republic
 Djibouti
 Eritrea
 Malawi
 Mauritius
 Réunion
 Somalia

Schedule
The schedule of the competition was as follows (all draws held at CAF headquarters in Cairo, Egypt unless otherwise stated).

Qualifying rounds

The draw for the preliminary, first and second qualifying rounds was held on 16 December 2013.

Qualification ties were played on a home-and-away two-legged basis. If the sides were level on aggregate after the second leg, the away goals rule was applied, and if still level, the tie proceeded directly to a penalty shoot-out (no extra time was played).

Preliminary round

|}

Notes

First round

|}

Second round

|}

The losers of the second round entered the 2014 CAF Confederation Cup play-off round.

Group stage

The draw for the group stage was held on 29 April 2014. The eight teams were drawn into two groups of four. Each group was played on a home-and-away round-robin basis. The winners and runners-up of each group advanced to the semi-finals.

Tiebreakers
The teams are ranked according to points (3 points for a win, 1 point for a draw, 0 points for a loss). If tied on points, tiebreakers are applied in the following order:
Number of points obtained in games between the teams concerned
Goal difference in games between the teams concerned
Away goals scored in games between the teams concerned
Goal difference in all games
Goals scored in all games

Group A

Group B

Knock-out stage

Knock-out ties were played on a home-and-away two-legged basis. If the sides were level on aggregate after the second leg, the away goals rule was applied, and if still level, the tie proceeded directly to a penalty shoot-out (no extra time was played).

Bracket

Semi-finals
In the semi-finals, the group A winners played the group B runners-up, and the group B winners played the group A runners-up, with the group winners hosting the second leg.

|}

Final

In the final, the order of legs was decided by a draw, held after the group stage draw.

Top scorers

See also
2014 CAF Confederation Cup
2014 FIFA Club World Cup
2015 CAF Super Cup

References

External links
Orange CAF Champions League 2014, CAFonline.com

 
2014
1